Mouloudia Club of Oujda, commonly abbreviated to MC Oudja, is a Moroccan football club based in Oujda. Mouloudia, which closely translates to "birth" in  Arabic, was named after the coincidence of the day of its creation: on March 16, 1946 (12 second spring of 1365 Hjeria) with the anniversary of the birth of Muhammad.

Businessman Mohamed Houar became president of the club in 2017, and his investment led to a 2017–18 Botola 2 title followed by strong performances in the Botola the following seasons. However, the club faced a crisis in 2021 when Houar announced he was leaving the club, with players and staff striking over unpaid wages.

Achievements
Moroccan League First Division
1975

Moroccan Cup
1957, 1958, 1960, 1962

Moroccan Super Cup
1960

Moroccan League Second Division
2003, 2007, 1964, 2018

Current squad

Kit supplier
Macron has been the team's kit supplier since the 2021/2022 season.

Managers
 Abdelhak Benchikha (2019–20)
Abdeslam Ouaddou   ( 2020 -2021) 
Mounir Jaouani      (2021 -2022)

References

External links
 Official website

Football clubs in Morocco
Oujda
Association football clubs established in 1946
1946 establishments in Morocco